This is a list of films produced by the Ollywood film industry based in Bhubaneshwar and Cuttack in 1936:

A-Z

References

1940
Films, Ollywood
1930s in Orissa
Ollywood